Pediodectes nigromarginatus, the black-margined shieldback, is a species of shield-backed katydid in the family Tettigoniidae. It is found in North America.

Subspecies
These two subspecies belong to the species Pediodectes nigromarginatus:
 Pediodectes nigromarginatus griseis (Caudell, 1907)
 Pediodectes nigromarginatus nigromarginatus (Caudell, 1902)

References

Tettigoniinae
Articles created by Qbugbot
Insects described in 1902